Pomalca District is one of twenty districts of the province Chiclayo in Peru. It limits by the North with the District of Picsi; by the East with the district of Tumán; to the south with the districts of Reque and Monsefú; and to the west with the districts of Chiclayo and José Leonardo Ortiz.

Population centers 

 Casa de Madera
 Collud
 El Combo
 El Chorro
 El Invernillo
 San Juan
 La Union
 Las Palmeras
 20 de Enero
 El Lino
 Ventarrón
 Collud
 Miraflores
 San Borja

History

Origin and foundation 
Pomalca is one of the Lambayecan districts with a great mixture of traditions and customs of different human groups, between regional and foreign, that for more than four centuries of existence brought their own culture to this land to intertwine, formed by descendants of Ventarrón and Collús.

Stage of encomienda 
Pomalca at the beginning was an encomienda that the Spanish Crown would create with the aim of controlling its new possessions in this part of the continent, and it began to entrust these lands and their inhabitants to those who participated in this conquest. Francisco Luís de Alcántara is entrusted with the lands occupied by the callancanos to make them produce wealth for him and the Spanish crown.

References